Beate Gangås (born 24 April 1963) is a Norwegian police officer and civil servant. In 2019, she was appointed Oslo Chief of Police.

She was born in Asker. In her younger days she played football for Asker.

She graduated from the University of Oslo with the cand.jur. degree in 1991. She worked for the Norwegian Directorate for Health from 1991 to 1992, served as a police prosecutor in Vest-Finnmark in 1992 before being hired in the Oslo police. From 2001 to 2006 she worked in the National Police Directorate. In 2006 she was appointed as the Norwegian Equality and Anti-Discrimination Ombud, a merger between the Centre for Equality, the Equality Ombud and the Centre Against Ethnic Discrimination. She became the chief of police in Østfold Police District in 2010, and in Oslo Police District in 2019.

In October 2022 she was appointed to director of the Norwegian Police Security Service.

Openly lesbian, she became the first LGBT police chief in Norway.

References

1963 births
Living people
People from Asker
Norwegian women's footballers
Asker Fotball (women) players
University of Oslo alumni
Norwegian police officers
Directors of government agencies of Norway
Ombudsmen in Norway
Norwegian lesbians
21st-century Norwegian LGBT people
Women's association footballers not categorized by position
Sportspeople from Viken (county)